Huang Yuguo (born 9 March 1990) is a Chinese male gymnast, specializing in the floor exercise and the horizontal bar. Huang participated in the 2014 Asian Games in Incheon, winning silver in  floor exercise.

References

Chinese male artistic gymnasts
Asian Games medalists in gymnastics
Gymnasts at the 2014 Asian Games
Asian Games silver medalists for China
Asian Games bronze medalists for China
Medalists at the 2014 Asian Games
Universiade medalists in gymnastics
1990 births
Living people
Universiade bronze medalists for China
Medalists at the 2009 Summer Universiade
21st-century Chinese people